Anthephora hermaphrodita is a species of grass in the family Poaceae. The species also goes by the common name oldfield grass.

The species is native to Aruba, Belize, Brazil, Colombia, Costa Rica, Cuba, Dominican Republic, Ecuador, El Salvador, Guatemala, Haiti, Honduras, Jamaica, Mexico, Netherlands Antilles, Nicaragua, Panamá, Peru, Trinidad-Tobago, and Venezuela.

References 

Panicoideae